Campeón a la fuerza is a 1950 Argentine film.

Cast
Alberto Closas
Pedro Quartucci
Mario Fortuna
Diana Maggi
Sofía Bozán
Carlos Castro
Tono Andreu
Pedro Laxalt
Fernando Campos
Augusto Codecá
Oscar Valicelli
Gregorio Barrios
El Hombre Montaña
Ricardo Lorenzo
Carmen Idal

External links

References

1950 films
1950s Spanish-language films
Argentine black-and-white films
Argentine comedy films
1950 comedy films
1950s Argentine films